Anambulyx is a monotypic moth genus in the family Sphingidae erected by Walter Rothschild and Karl Jordan in 1903. Its only species, Anambulyx elwesi, or Elwes' pink-and-green hawkmoth, was first described by Herbert Druce in 1882.

Distribution 
Is known from northern Pakistan, northern India, Nepal, south-western China, northern Thailand and northern Vietnam.

Biology 
Adults have been recorded from May to July in Thailand.

References

Smerinthini
Monotypic moth genera
Taxa named by Walter Rothschild
Taxa named by Karl Jordan
Moths of Asia